This is a list of F.C. Copenhagen's managers and their records, from 1992, when the team was founded, to the present day.

History

The first manager of F.C. Copenhagen was Benny Johansen, who was manager of one of the mother clubs, B 1903, before 1992. Johansen has sat the position twice: the first period ended in 1994, but later same year he substituted Keld Kristensen, who only received 8 matches with the team.

Records

There have been eight different permanent and two caretaker managers of FCK since 1992; one of the caretakers (Kim Brink) has managed the club in three separate spells. The longest-running manager in terms of time is Hans Backe (2001–2005), who also is the longest-running in terms of games. The only two persons, who has managed FCK, that isn't from Scandinavia is Roy Hodgson and Ariël Jacobs. The most successful permanent manager was Kent Karlsson, in terms of percentage of wins with 55.38%, while Christian Andersen is FCK's least successful (0.00%). Andersen is also the shortest-running permanent manager of FCK, and received only a single match, before he was fired.

Managers
As of 5 March 2021. Only competitive matches are counted. Wins, losses and draws are results at the final whistle; the results of penalty shoot-outs are not counted.

Key
* Served as caretaker manager.
† Served as caretaker manager before being appointed permanently.

References

Managers
 
Copenhagen
F.C. Copenhagen
F.C. Copenhagen